Petroscirtes ancylodon, the Arabian fangblenny, is a species of combtooth blenny found in the western Indian ocean, and since 1989 recorded on occasion in the Levantine waters of the Mediterranean Sea, a likely entry from the Suez Canal. Males of this species reach a length of 11.5 cm TL while females reach a maximum length of 7.9 cm SL.

References

ancylodon
Fish described in 1835